Alan Campbell (born 10 August 1960 is a former professional footballer who played as a forward.

He played for Shamrock Rovers, Racing de Santander, CD Logroñés, Berchem Sport, Dundee and Forfar Athletic. At international level, he made three appearances for the Republic of Ireland national team.

Career
Campbell was born in Dublin, Ireland. He made his Rovers debut on 11 October 1978 in the Leinster Senior Cup and scored twice in a 5–1 win over St. Francis. He made his League of Ireland debut at Galway on 18 March 1979 scoring once in a 2–0 win. Campbell made 4 appearances in European competition, scoring once. as well as one Inter-League cap. He was also the League of Ireland top goalscorer in the 1979–80 season with 22 goals.

For Racing de Santander he made 63 appearances scoring 15 goals, for CD Logroñés he made 32 appearances scoring 9 goals.

After three years in Spain he turned down a move to Celtic to play in Belgium in 1987.

References 

 The Hoops by Paul Doolan and Robert Goggins

1960 births
Living people
Association footballers from Dublin (city)
Republic of Ireland association footballers
Republic of Ireland international footballers
Republic of Ireland youth international footballers
Association football forwards
Shamrock Rovers F.C. players
League of Ireland players
League of Ireland XI players
Racing de Santander players
CD Logroñés footballers
Dundee F.C. players
Forfar Athletic F.C. players
K. Berchem Sport players
La Liga players
Scottish Football League players
Republic of Ireland expatriate association footballers
Irish expatriate sportspeople in Belgium
Expatriate footballers in Spain
Irish expatriate sportspeople in Spain
Expatriate footballers in Belgium
Irish expatriate sportspeople in Scotland
Expatriate footballers in Scotland